Thomas Bromwich (by 1523 – 1557 or later) was the Member of Parliament for Hereford, England, in the parliament of April 1554.

References

16th-century births
16th-century deaths
English MPs 1554